École secondaire de Par-en-Bas (commonly known as Par-en-bas, PEB or ESPB) is a Canadian French high school located in Tusket, Yarmouth County in the province of Nova Scotia, for Acadian students. The school hosts grades 7 through 12, with approximately 400 students. The construction of an amphitheater/community center as an addition to the school was completed in 2011.

History 

The school was built to separate the French-speaking students and English-speaking students from their previous location, École Sainte-Anne-du-Ruisseau, which was closed due to age and the fact that the English school board and the French school board wanted separate schools. The school is in the Conseil scolaire acadien provincial school board.

Administration 

Marc Émond - Principal
Anne d’Entremont - Vice Principal

External links
École secondaire de Par-en-Bas school website
École Saine-Anne-du-Ruisseau former school website

Middle schools in Nova Scotia
High schools in Nova Scotia
Schools in Yarmouth County